Charles Baillie, Lord Jerviswood  (3 November 1804 – 23 July 1879) was a Scottish advocate, judge and politician.

Baillie was the second son of George Baillie of Mellerstain House and Jerviswood (1763–1841), son of the Hon. George Hamilton, younger brother of Thomas Hamilton, 7th Earl of Haddington. His mother was Mary (d. 1865), youngest daughter of Sir James Pringle, 4th Baronet of Stitchill (1726–1809) by his spouse Elizabeth (1784–1826), daughter of Norman MacLeod of that Ilk, 19th Chief of MacLeod. He was born at Mellerstain House.

Elected to the Faculty of Advocates in 1830, he was an advocate depute from 1844 to 1846 and in 1852. He was sheriff of Stirlingshire from 1853 to 1858, Solicitor General for Scotland in 1858, and Lord Advocate from 1858 to 1859. He was elected as member of parliament for Linlithgowshire in 1859. He was raised to rank and precedence of an earl's son and raised to the bench as a judge of the Court of Session in 1859, taking the judicial title Lord Jerviswood. He was appointed a Lord of Justiciary in 1862. He retired in 1874.

Charles Baillie married, on 27 December 1831, the Hon. Anne (d.1880), third daughter of Hugh Scott of Harden (1758–1841) whose claim as Lord Polwarth, in the Peerage of Scotland, was admitted by the House of Lords in July 1835. They left children.

He died at Dryburgh House and is buried in the family vault at Mellerstain House.

Arms

See also
Earl of Haddington

References

The Peerage of the British Empire, by Edmund Lodge, Norroy King of Arms, 27th edition, London, 1858, pps:276-7.

External links 
 

1804 births
1879 deaths
People from Berwickshire
Scottish sheriffs
Lord Advocates
Members of the Parliament of the United Kingdom for Scottish constituencies
UK MPs 1857–1859
Jerviswood
Members of the Faculty of Advocates
Fellows of the Royal Society of Edinburgh
Politics of West Lothian
19th-century Scottish people
Solicitors General for Scotland